The Maker is an album by guitarist Pat Martino, recorded in 1994 and released on the Japanese Paddlewheel label.

Reception

AllMusic stated that "this is a highly recommended session featuring all original Martino compositions and more proof that the master was indeed back."

The authors of the Penguin Guide to Jazz Recordings wrote: "Ten years on from the comeback, a strong set from an active period."

Track listing

Personnel 
Pat Martino – guitar
James Ridl – piano
Marc Johnson – bass
Joe Bonadio – drums

References 

Pat Martino albums
1995 albums